

The RTAF-2 is a single-engine training and liaison aircraft that was developed by the Royal Thai Air Force's Science and Weapon Systems Development Centre in 1957.

Development
The RTAF-2 was developed from the Fuji LM-1 Nikko, itself a derivative of the Beechcraft Bonanza. One prototype was built in 1957 and tested in 1957–58, although no further production followed.

By 1984 the sole example had been turned over to the Royal Thai Air Force Museum, Don Mueang District, Bangkok.

Operators

 Royal Thai Air Force

Aircraft on display
Royal Thai Air Force Museum near Bangkok - sole example

See also

References

External links

Thai Aviation
History of The Royal Thai Air Force - Royal Thai Air Force Aircraft Designations

Aircraft manufactured in Thailand
Single-engined tractor aircraft
Low-wing aircraft
1950s Thai military trainer aircraft
Aircraft first flown in 1957